Ratinho is the Portuguese word for little rat. Ratinho may refer to:

People
 Ratinho (TV presenter) (born 1956), full name Carlos Roberto Massa, Brazilian television host, politician, and businessman
 Ratinho (footballer, born 1971), full name Everson Rodrigues, Brazilian football midfielder
 Luciano Ratinho (born 1979), full name Luciano Ferreira Gabriel, Brazilian football midfielder
 Ratinho Júnior (born 1981), full name Carlos Roberto Massa Júnior, Brazilian politician
 Edson Ratinho (born 1986), full name Edson Ramos da Silva, Brazilian football right-back
 Eduardo Ratinho (born 1987), full name Eduardo Correia Piller Filho, Brazilian football right-back
 Ratinho (fighter) (born 1991), full name Rodrigo Lima, Brazilian mixed martial artist
 Ratinho (footballer, born 1996), full name Jurani Francisco Ferreira, Brazilian football midfielder

See also
 Programa do Ratinho, Brazilian talk show program